South Spencer High School is a public high school in Reo, Indiana. The school educates about 471 students in grades 9 to 12 in the South Spencer School Corporation district.

Athletics

The school's athletic nickname is the "Rebels", and it participates in the Pocket Athletic Conference.

Baseball
In 2007, 2011, 2013, & 2015 the boys' baseball team won the Division 2A State Title.

Softball
In 2014, the softball team won the Division 2A State Title.

Football
South Spencer's football team has played for a state championship one time in 1988.

Marching band
South Spencer's marching band, known as the Marching Rebels, has made it to regionals every year since 1981.  They have competed at state in class D in 1983, 1985, 1986, 1987, 1997, 1999, 2001, 2012, 2013, 2014, 2015, 2017, and 2018 and in class C in 1988 and 1989.

Mascot
The mascot of South Spencer is the Rebel Man.

See also
 List of high schools in Indiana

References

External links
South Spencer High School website

 

Public high schools in Indiana
High schools in Southwestern Indiana
Schools in Spencer County, Indiana
Pocket Athletic Conference